The 1960 NCAA Swimming and Diving Championships were contested in March 1960 at Perkins Natatorium at Southern Methodist University in University Park, Texas at the 24th annual officially NCAA-sanctioned swim meet to determine the team and individual national champions of men's collegiate swimming and diving in the United States. Including the championships held before NCAA sponsorship in 1937, this was the 37th overall American collegiate championship.

USC claimed its first national title after finishing fourteen points ahead of three-time defending champions Michigan in the team standings.

Team standings
Note: Top 10 only
(H) = Hosts
Full results

See also
List of college swimming and diving teams

References

NCAA Division I Men's Swimming and Diving Championships
NCAA Swimming And Diving Championships
NCAA Swimming And Diving Championships
NCAA Swimming And Diving Championships